Sf5 or variation may refer to:

 Disulfur decafluoride (S2F10) a chemical reductively rendered as "SF5" (monosulfur pentafluoride)
 Street Fighter V, a fighting video game
 CASA SF-5, Spanish-built license production variants of the Northrup F-5 Tiger II Freedom Fighter jet fighter
 Sablatnig SF-5, German WWI reconnaissance seaplane
 , U.S. Navy Barracuda-class submarine
 SF Motors SF5, an electric sport utility sedan
 Sf5 glass

See also
 SF (disambiguation)